Kristijan Milić (born 25 December 1969) is a Croatian television and feature film director.

He is best known for winning two awards Golden Arena for Best Director at the Pula Film Festival (Croatian national film awards) for his feature films The Living and the Dead (Živi i Mrtvi; 2007) and Number 55 (Broj 55; 2014).

Milić is also well known for TV series Najbolje godine (2009–2011).

External links

1969 births
Living people
Television people from Zagreb
Croatian film directors
Golden Arena for Best Director winners
Film people from Zagreb